Rizhsky station (Rizhsky vokzal, Riga station) is one of the ten main railway stations in Moscow, Russia. It was built in 1901. As well as being an active station it also houses the Moscow Railway Museum. The station is operated by the Moscow Railway.

It is located at Rizhskaya Square, at the crossing of Mira Avenue and Sushchyovsky Val. The station is served by Rizhskaya metro station. Although Rizhsky Station is relatively the least busiest station in Moscow, its connection to Latvia is Moscow's only, and is highly used. On the intersection of two main roads, Rizhsky is adjacent to a Holiday Inn hotel, a large market, and numerous Moscow apartments and offices. In addition,  Rizhskiy Station has some of the best architecture of all the Moscow "vokzals".

History
The construction of the railway between Moscow and Vindava (Moscow–Vindava Railway) started in 1897. On June 30, 1901 the passenger traffic between Moscow and Volokolamsk was opened. Since the main station in Moscow was not ready at the time, the eastern terminal station in Moscow was Sortirovochnaya (currently Podmoskovnaya). The Vindavsky railway station, currently the Rizhsky railway station, was opened on September 11, 1901. The building, in the style of eclecticism, was built using the project of the architect Stanislav Brzhozovsky. The construction was supervised by the architect Yuly Diederichs.

After 1918, when Latvia became independent, the former Vindava line decayed, since it did not serve any big cities. In 1930, the station was renamed Baltiysky railway station, in 1942 - Rzhevsky railway station, and since January 1, 1948, when Latvia has been already annexed by Soviet Union, it was renamed Rizhsky railway station. Originally, the suburban railway line was scheduled to be electrified in 1943, but the electrification of the stretch between Moscow and Nakhabino only occurred in 1945, after World War II was finished.

Trains and destinations

Long distance

Other destinations

Suburban destinations
Suburban commuter trains (elektrichka) connect the Rizhsky station with stations and platforms of the Rizhsky suburban railway line, in particular, with the towns of Krasnogorsk, Dedovsk, Istra, and Volokolamsk.

Moscow Railway Museum at Rizhsky station 
In 2004, the open-air site of the Museum of the Moscow Railway was opened next to Rizhsky railway station. The other site of this museum shows Lenin's funeral train in the Museum of the Moscow Railway (Paveletskaya station).

Gallery

See also

 The Museum of the Moscow Railway, at Paveletsky railway station, Moscow
 Russian Railway Museum, in St. Petersburg
 Finland Station, St. Petersburg
 History of rail transport in Russia
 Emperor railway station in Pushkin town
 List of Moscow tourist attractions
 List of railway museums (worldwide)
 Heritage railways
 List of heritage railways
 Restored trains

References

External links

Rizhsky station 
Latvian Railways (Latvijas dzelzceļš) 
Russian Railways (Российские Железные Дороги) 
The Moscow Railway Museum at Rizhsky station

Railway stations in Moscow
Railway stations in the Russian Empire opened in 1901
Railway stations of Moscow Railway
Cultural heritage monuments of regional significance in Moscow